Richard S. Cohen (April 5, 1937 – April 13, 1998) was an American lawyer from Maine. Cohen, a Republican, was a career prosecutor and served as Maine Attorney General from 1978 to 1981. The Maine Attorney General is elected by the Maine Legislature.

Cohen grew up in Brookline, Massachusetts and graduated from the University of Georgia undergraduate and Boston University School of Law before taking the position of counsel to the bureau of taxation in the Maine Attorney General's office.  Among his accomplishments, Cohen helped negotiate the Maine Indian Claims Settlement Act during his time in office. He also "revolutionized" the Attorney General's office, creating the Maine Criminal Justice Academy and introducing other reforms. After the Democratic Party won back the Legislature in 1980, Cohen was replaced by James Tierney. However, newly elected President Ronald Reagan appointed Cohen as a U.S. attorney. After finishing his 12-year term, Cohen became private counsel to the Passamaquoddy Tribe. Cohen became ill in 1997 and died at Mount Sinai Hospital in New York City after suffering from Crohn's disease.

References

1937 births
1998 deaths
Politicians from Brookline, Massachusetts
Maine Attorneys General
Boston University School of Law alumni
Maine Republicans
20th-century American politicians